The Faculty of Humanities is the oldest faculty of Eötvös Loránd University and is located on the institution's Trefort Garden campus in Józsefváros, Budapest, Hungary. It was founded by the Cardinal Archbishop of Esztergom Prince Primate of Hungary, Péter Pázmány, in 1635.

History

The Faculty of Humanities of the Eötvös Loránd University was founded by Péter Pázmány, Archbishop of Esztergom, on 12 May 1635. The university was operated by the Society of Jesus and it consisted of two faculties: The Faculty of Humanities and the Faculty of Theology.
 
Initially, there was only a three-year teaching program and students could obtain three academic titles: Bachelor's degree, Master's degree, and Doctor of Philosophy. In 1770, the Faculty of Humanities adopted the reforms introduced at the University of Vienna. The university then became state-owned and a dean and a director of the Faculty were appointed to monitor its functioning. In 1777, the Faculty of Humanities was moved to Buda, the western part of today's Budapest, along with the faculty of Theology and the Faculty of Law. However, the faculties were moved back seven years later. The late 18th century also saw changes in the university. The changes closely followed the pattern employed at the University of Vienna. However, the language of teaching remained Latin until 1844. The Hungarian Revolution of 1848 also affected the university, since a university reform program, designed by József Eötvös in 1850, restructured the educational system. Included in those changes: the two-year introductory course was abandoned and was replaced with a four-year program. In addition, the Faculty of Humanities became equal to other faculties of the university.
 
The number of students was low in the 1850s. However, an increase could be seen in the late 18th century.
 
In 1983, the Faculty of Teacher Training was established which meant the faculty of Humanities did not train primary and secondary school teachers. However, in 2003 the Faculty of Teacher Training was terminated and the Faculty of Humanities started training teachers again along with the Faculty of Natural Sciences.
 
The early 2000s saw major changes in the system of the Faculty of Humanities after new faculties were created. First, the Faculty of Primary and Pre-school Education was established in 2000. Second, the Faculty of Psychology and Education and the Faculty of Sociology were created in 2003.

In 2005, Tibor Frank, professor at the School of English & American Studies, was interviewed by BBC on the 1956 Hungarian Revolution.

In 2016, the findings of the Faculty's researchers on the Viking culture were featured in The Times.

In 2018, Viktor Orbán's chief of staff announced that government would no longer finance any university programmes on gender studies.

In 2018, many institutes of the Faculty expressed their solidarity with the George Soros-founded Central European University.

On 12 August 2019, the Faculty's former student and professor, Agnes Heller, died.

On 5 September 2022, the Dean of the Faculty announced that the autumn break would be postponed to December and the exams would be held online due to the energy crisis caused by the Russo-Ukrainian war.

Institutes
The Faculty of Humanities consists of 16 institutes:

Organisation
The current leadership consists of 1 dean and 4 vice-deans.

Faculty leadership

Notable Former Deans

1900–01: Frigyes Medveczky 
1902–03: Imre Payer
1908–09: Oszkár Asbóth
1917–18: Ignác Goldziher
1925–26: Arthur Yolland
1927–28: Lajos Méhelÿ
1928–29: Antal Hekler
1932–33: Gyula Németh
1933–34: Gyula Kornis
1934–35: Zoltán Gombocz
1934–35: Gyula Németh
1944–47: István Hajnal
1956–57: István Kniezsa
1969–75: György Székely
2000–01: Sándor Fodor

Honorary doctors
The following people were awarded with Honorary title by the Faculty of Humanities.
 2020–21:  Marie-Vic Ozouf-Marignier, az École des Hautes Études en Sciences Sociales (EHESS) professzora
 2019–20:  Claus von Carnap-Bornheimet, a Christian-Albrechts-Universität professzora
2017–18:  Waldemar Zacharasiewicz, professor of University of Vienna
2016–17:  Miklós Szabó, professor emeritus
2016–17:  Xu Lin, director of Language Education Council in China
2015–16:  Janusz K. Kozlowski, archeologist (professor emeritus)
2014–15:  Mario Vargas Llosa, Nobel prize winner writer
2013–14:  Robert John Weston Evans, professor of Oxford University
2012–13:  Dominique Combe, professor of École normale supérieure
2012–13:  Harriet Zuckerman, professor of Columbia University
2012–13:  Reinhard Olt, correspondent of  Frankfurter Allgemeine Zeitung in Budapest
2011–12:  Hans Ulrich Gumbrecht, professor of Stanford University
2010–11:  Jacques Roubaud, contemporary French poet, mathematician, member of Oulipo
2010–11:  Ferenc Pölöskei, professor at Eötvös Loránd Tudományegyetem 
2009–10:  José Saramago, Nobel Prize-winning writer†
2008–09:  Zsigmond Ritoók, professor emeritus

Research
Currently, there are twenty-four research centres at the department level, institution level, and faculty level.

In 1998, Zoltán Dörnyei and Kata Csizér's article was published by Language Teaching Research. In their study on language learning motivation, they compiled a set of strategies to facilitate language teachers how to motivate learners.

On April 18 2010, Eötvös Loránd University was officially granted the status of research university. The Faculty of Humanities along with the Faculty of Science and the Faculty of Law is the faculty that deals with scientific research activities. The Faculty of Humanities has always viewed scientific research and the education of future generations as highly important. Eötvös Loránd University was awarded the Social Renewal Operational Programme’s research university bid called by the Hungarian National Development Agency (TÁMOP-4.2.1/B-09/1/KMR). The aim of the project was to improve the quality of higher education and foster university research. The project was implemented between June 1, 2010, and May 31, 2012, with a 3 billion forint grant from the government and the European Union.

On 16 August 2010, Dan Payne, from BBC, interviewed Károly Szerencsés from the Institute of History on the legacy of János Kádár. The title of the article was "Hungary divided over Janos Kadar and his legacy".

Notable researchers

Notable alumni

Géza Alföldy, historian
 József Antall, Prime Minister of Hungary, 1990-1993
 Wilhelm Bacher, Jewish Hungarian scholar, rabbi, Orientalist, and linguist
 Erzsébet Bajári, entomologist, wasp researcher
 Zsófia Bán, writer
 György Bence, philosopher
 Therese Benedek, Hungarian-American psychoanalyst
Nóra Berend, historian
András Bereznay, historian
Jakob Bleyer, literary scholar
 Koloman Brenner, politician
György Csepeli, psychologist
 Kata Csizér, applied linguist
 Mózes Csoma, koreanist
 Sándor Csoóri, writer
 Zoltán Dörnyei, applied linguist
 Ahn Eak-tai, Korean classical composer
 Péter Esterházy, novelist
 Kinga Fabó, poet, essayist, and linguist
 Endre Fülei-Szántó, linguist
 Alabert Fogarasi, philosopher
 Tibor Frank, historian
 László Garai, scholar of psychology
Ágnes Gergely, writer
Ferenc Glatz, historian (1964)
István Hahn, historian
Imre Hamar, sinologist
 Béla Hamvas, poet
 Pál Schiller Harkai, philosopher and psychologist
 Ágnes Heller, philosopher
István Hiller, politician
Rózsa Hoffmann, politician
 Zsuzsanna Jakab, director of the World Health Organization's Regional Office for Europe
 László Kákosy, egyptologist
 András Kenessei, art historian, writer and journalist
 Karl Kerényi, scholar in classical philology, co-founder of modern studies in Greek mythology
 György Konrád, novelist
 Judit Kormos, applied linguist
 Gyula Kornis, philosopher
László Krasznahorkai, writer
 Viktor Kubiszyn, writer
 Endre Kukorelly, writer
 György Lukács, philosopher
 Tibor Lutter, literary scholar
Bálint Magyar, politician
Károly Marót, historian
Péter Medgyes, linguist
 László Mérő, research psychologist and popular science author
István Mészáros, philosopher
 Teodor Murăşanu, Romanian writer and teacher
 Ádám Nádasdy, linguist and poet
 Gábor Nógrádi, poet
 Raphael Patai, Hungarian-Jewish ethnographer, historian, Orientalist and anthropologist
 Ákos Pauler, philosopher
 Arthur J. Patterson, literary scholar
 Ágoston Pável, Hungarian Slovene writer, poet, ethnologist, linguist and historian
 Csaba Pléh, psychologist
 Karl Polanyi, philosopher and historian
 László Rudas, philosopher
 Mária Schmidt, historian
 Tamás Soproni, politician
 József Szájer, MEP (Fidesz)
 Miklós Szenczi, literary scholar
Viktor Szigetvári, politician
 Ágnes Szokolszky, psychologist
 Stephen Ullmann, linguist of Romance languages, scholar of semantics
 Maria Sarungi Tsehai, activist
István Stumpf, politician
 Gábor Vona, politician
Moritz Wahrmann, politician
 Sándor Wekerle, three-time prime minister of the Kingdom of Hungary
István Winkler, psychologist
Arthur B. Yolland, literary scholar

Library

 
The Faculty has one main library, located in Trefort Garden, and 13 libraries at institutional levels. The Institute of Romance Studies has libraries at the departmental level.
School of English and American Studies Library
Institute of Philosophy Library
Institute of Germanic Studies Library
Institute of Library and Information Science Library
Institute of Hungarian Literature and Cultural Studies Toldy Ferenc Library
Institute of Hungarian Linguistics and Finno-Ugric Studies Library
Institute of Art History Library
Institute of Ethnography and Folklore Library
Institute of Ancient and Classical Studies Harmatta János Library
Institute of Archaeological Sciences Library
Institute of Slavonic and Baltic Philology Library
Institute of East Asian Studies Library
Institute of Historical Studies Szekfű Gyula Library
The library of Medieval Studies of the Central European University was located in the building of ELTE’s Faculty of Humanities.

Gallery

References

External links

 

Eötvös Loránd University
1635 establishments in the Habsburg monarchy
17th-century establishments in Hungary
Józsefváros